Tropaeolum pentaphyllum is a species of perennial plant in the nasturtium family Tropaeolaceae. It is found in Argentina, Brazil, Paraguay, and Uruguay.

pentaphyllum